The 2022 CAFA U-15 Girls Championship was the third edition of the CAFA U-15 Girls Championship, the international women's football youth championship of Central Asia organized by the Central Asian Football Association (CAFA). It was held in Tajikistan from 21 to 26 October 2022.:The tournament saw the participation of teams from 3 members association (IR Iran, the Host Tajikistan and Uzbekistan).

Uzbekistan dethroned the defending champion Iran after they finished top of the standings on superior goal difference

Teams
A total of 3 (out of 6) CAFA member national teams entered the tournament.

Did not enter

Main tournament

Champion

Player awards

The following awards were given at the conclusion of the tournament

Goalscorers

References

U15 2022
CAFA U15
CAFA U15